Microsoft MACRO-80 (often shortened to M80) is a relocatable macro assembler for Intel 8080 and Zilog Z80 microcomputer systems.
The complete MACRO-80 package includes the MACRO-80 Assembler, the LINK-80 Linking Loader, and the CREF-80 Cross Reference Facility. The LIB-80 Library Manager is included in CP/M versions only.
The list price at the time was $200.

Overview
A MACRO-80 source program consists of a series of statements. Each statement must follow a predefined format. Source lines up to 132 characters in length are supported. M80 accepts source files almost identical to files for Intel-compatible assemblers. It also supports several switches in the command string. Some can be used to control the format of the source file. A switch can be set to allow support for Z80 mnemonics.

MACRO-80 runs on Digital Research CP/M, Intel ISIS-II, Tandy TRSDOS, Tektronix TEKDOS, and Microsoft MSX-DOS.

See also

 Microsoft Macro Assembler
 Assembly language
 High-level assembler
 Comparison of assemblers

References

External links
 CP/M-80 Information and Download Page

Assemblers
Microsoft development tools
MSX-DOS